École nationale supérieure d'ingénieurs de Bretagne Sud (ENSIBS) a French engineering College created in 2007.

The school trains engineers in Civil engineering, Industrial engineering, mechatronics, cybersecurity and cyberdefense.

Located in Lorient, as well as in Vannes, the ENSIBS is a public higher education institution. The school is a member of the Southern Brittany University.

References

External links
 ENSIBS

Engineering universities and colleges in France
Vannes
ENSIBS
Lorient
Educational institutions established in 2007
2007 establishments in France